Backdraft is a 1991 American action thriller film directed by Ron Howard and written by Gregory Widen. The film stars Kurt Russell, William Baldwin, Scott Glenn, Jennifer Jason Leigh, Rebecca De Mornay, Donald Sutherland, Robert De Niro, Jason Gedrick, and J. T. Walsh, and follows Chicago firefighters on the trail of a serial arsonist. Filming in Chicago began on July 23, 1990, and was wrapped up on December 8, 1990. Before the filming started, the main actors went out on calls with real Chicago firefighters. All of the main actors also went to the Chicago Fire Academy to learn how to be like the firefighters in the film.

The film was released on May 24, 1991 to favorable reviews from critics, and grossed $152.4 million worldwide. The film received three Oscar nominations - Best Sound, Best Sound Editing, and Best Visual Effects - but lost all of these to Terminator 2: Judgment Day. The film also inspired a special effects attraction at Universal Studios Hollywood, which opened in 1992 and closed in 2010. It was followed by the sequel Backdraft 2 in 2019, with Baldwin and Sutherland reprising their roles.

Plot
Two firefighters of Engine 17 of the Chicago Fire Department are brothers. Lt. Stephen "Bull" McCaffrey, the elder, is experienced, while Brian has labored under his brother's shadow. Brian returns to firefighting after several other careers falter, though Stephen has doubts that Brian is fit to be a firefighter. In 1971, Brian witnessed the death of their firefighting father, Captain Dennis McCaffrey, while accompanying him on a call. The longest-serving of all the men at Engine 17, John "Axe" Adcox, served under the McCaffreys' father and was like an uncle to the boys when their father died. Adcox grows concerned about Stephen's unorthodox methods and disregard for safety procedures, as does Stephen's wife Helen, who separated from Stephen to protect herself and their son Sean from the risks he was taking.

Inspector Donald "Shadow" Rimgale, a dedicated arson investigator and veteran firefighter is called in because some recent explosive fires resemble those set by pyromaniac Ronald Bartel, who has been imprisoned for years. Brian is reassigned as his assistant after an argument with Stephen. Rimgale manipulates Ronald's obsession with fire to ensure his annual parole application is rejected. It is revealed during an investigation that Chicago City Council alderman Marty Swayzak has supported fire department budget cuts. Contractors paid him off to shut down firehouses so they could be converted into community centers, with the contractors receiving contracts for the construction. Brian rekindles a relationship with Jennifer Vaitkus, an aide to Swayzak.

When Engine 17 answers a call in a high-rise, Stephen urges them to move in quickly, despite Adcox's advice to wait for backup. Brian's friend and fellow trainee, Tim Krizminski, opens a door, triggering a backdraft. His face is burned beyond recognition and he barely survives. Adcox and Brian both condemn Stephen for what happened. Rimgale and Brian go to Swayzak's home to confront him after learning of his connection to the three backdraft victims, Alan Seagrave, Donald Cosgrove, and Jeffery Holcomb, interrupting a masked man about to set the place on fire. The man attacks them with a flashlight but is burned on his shoulder by an electrical socket. Rimgale saves Brian and Swayzak from the house but is injured in an explosion. In his hospital bed, Rimgale tells Brian to revisit Ronald, who helps Brian realize that only a firefighter would be so careful as to not let backdraft fires rage out of control.

Brian suspects Stephen but spots a burn in the shape of an electrical socket on Adcox's back and reveals his suspicions to his brother just before an alarm. When Brian realizes Adcox has heard their exchange, he jumps aboard Truck 46 after borrowing some turnout gear. On their way to the fire their truck crashes after dodging a taxi. Stephen confronts Adcox about the backdrafts during a multiple-alarm fire at a chemical plant. Adcox admits that he set the fires to kill Swayzak's associates because Swayzak benefitted from firefighters' deaths and closed down firehouses. When an explosion destroys the catwalk they are on, Stephen grabs Adcox's hand while hanging on to the remains of the catwalk. Stephen refuses Adcox's advice to let go of him and loses his grip on the catwalk. Stephen lands on the lower catwalk, but Adcox dies when he falls into the fire. Brian bravely battles the fire, allowing two firefighters to reach Stephen and carry him to safety. Stephen dies with Brian by his side on the way to the hospital, with his final request being that Brian not reveal Adcox to be the perpetrator.

After Stephen and Adcox's funeral, Brian and Rimgale, with the help of the police, interrupt Swayzak at a press conference. Rimgale questions Swayzak on a fake manpower study that led to the deaths of several firemen, including Stephen and Adcox. They also state that Swayzak engineered the downsizing of the Chicago Fire Department, destroying Swayzak's mayoral ambitions. Brian continues as a firefighter, carrying on his family's firefighting tradition despite the loss of his father and brother.

Cast

Production
Rubber cement from Petronio Shoe Products was used to create some of the fire effects. Industrial Light & Magic created many of the visual effects.

Casting

Robert Downey Jr., Brad Pitt and Keanu Reeves auditioned for the role of Brian McCaffrey.

Realism
Firefighting professionals have noted that most real structure fires differ from what is shown in the movie by having smoke conditions that obscure vision inside the building almost completely.

The pictures of firefighters searching in movies like Backdraft do not show what it is like to search in a fire. Firefighters are shown advancing through fully involved structure fires while not wearing the complete complement of protective gear (Nomex hoods, radios, PASS devices). Most scenes display firefighting without the use of SCBA &lsqb;self-contained breathing apparatus&rsqb;. Realism in our case would make a very bad movie because the fact is that in almost every fire the smoke conditions completely obscure all vision.

"The movie...came pretty close at times, but it also suffered from the very same, all too common shortcomings that any visual presentation was bound to encounter (...) Smoke, steam, and other miscellaneous factors usually combine to obscure almost everything that is taking place".

Furthermore, fire investigation professionals have dismissed the investigative methods shown in the movie as unscientific, in particular, the portrayal of fire as a living entity.

Music
Backdraft was scored by Hans Zimmer, and features two songs by Bruce Hornsby, "The Show Goes On" (which was previously released on his album Scenes from the Southside) and the new song "Set Me in Motion". Zimmer's score was pared to about 30 minutes for release on the soundtrack album, which also features both Hornsby songs. The soundtrack was issued by Milan Records on May 14, 1991. The track "Fighting 17th" was used as the main theme for RTÉ’s Six Nations Championship coverage in Ireland. "Show Me Your Firetruck" was used as the theme for the Fuji TV series Iron Chef.

Release

Home media
The film has been released in many formats with it first on VHS and then DVD. In 2006 a 2-disc DVD Anniversary Edition was issued.
On January 4, 2011 Universal Pictures released a Blu-ray 'Anniversary Edition' with many of the features ported from the previous DVD release including four featurettes, 43-minutes of deleted scenes, a 3-minute Ron Howard introduction and trailers. It was released for the first time as a two-disc Ultra HD Blu-ray package on May 4, 2019.

Reception

Box office
The film grossed $77,868,585 in the US (ranking 14th in box-office for 1991), and $74,500,000 in other markets.

Critical response
Praise for Backdraft was directed to the special effects and performances, while much criticism was reserved for the story. The film holds a 75% rating on Rotten Tomatoes based on 59 reviews, with an average rating of 6.2/10. The consensus reads, "It's not particularly deep, but Backdraft is a strong action movie with exceptional special effects." Film critics Gene Siskel of the Chicago Tribune and Roger Ebert of the Chicago Sun-Times gave the film positive reviews.

Audiences polled by CinemaScore gave the film an average grade of "A" on an A+ to F scale.

Accolades
The film received three Academy Award nominations for Sound, Sound Effects Editing, and Visual Effects, but lost to Terminator 2: Judgment Day in every category.

Other media

Sequel

In March 2018, it was announced that Universal had tapped Spanish director Gonzalo López-Gallego to direct the sequel with William Baldwin reprising his role. The film, titled Backdraft 2, was released direct-to-video on May 14, 2019.

Theme park attraction

References

External links

1991 films
1991 action thriller films
American action thriller films
American disaster films
1990s English-language films
Films about arson
Films about brothers
Films set in Chicago
Films shot in Chicago
Films about firefighting
Films directed by Ron Howard
Backdraft (franchise)
Imagine Entertainment films
Universal Pictures films
Films scored by Hans Zimmer
Films with screenplays by Gregory Widen
Chicago Fire Department
1990s American films